West Suffolk Hospital is a small district general hospital in Bury St Edmunds, England. It is managed by the West Suffolk NHS Foundation Trust.

History
The hospital was built in a former Ordnance Depot in Hospital Road in Bury St Edmunds. It was opened as the Bury and Suffolk General Hospital on 4 January 1825. It was extended in 1861 and balconies were added in 1908. It became the Suffolk General Hospital in 1902 and the West Suffolk General Hospital in 1929.

After joining the National Health Service in 1948, it moved to Hardwick Lane in Bury St Edmunds in 1973. The hospital received extensive publicity when Myra Hindley, the Moors murderer, died there in November 2002. The Marquess of Bristol, whose former home was Ickworth House near Bury St Edmunds, opened a new Friends of the Hospital shop in June 2013.

Services
The hospital provides accident & emergency, maternity, oncology and palliative care services.

Investigation into anonymous letters
After a member of staff had written anonymously to the family of Susan Warby, a patient who had died whilst under treatment at the hospital, staff were asked to provide handwriting samples and fingerprints to a serious incident enquiry. Senior staff expressed serious concerns that these efforts to identify a whistleblower might inhibit the future reporting of safety issues. At an inquest into the death which commenced at Suffolk Coroner's Court on 16 January 2020, the coroner called for a police investigation into the death. Matt Hancock, the Secretary of State for Health and Social Care requested an independent review into the treatment of whistleblowers at West Suffolk Hospital. The inquest concluded in September 2020 making serious criticisms of the management of the Intensive Care Unit.

The family of Horace Nunn also received an anonymous letter after Nunn died following suboptimal care at West Suffolk Hospital.  The hospital had not told the family about problems with Nunn's care before a whistleblower sent them a letter.  A whistleblower alleges a doctor involved in Nunn's care had previously endangered patients by injecting himself with drugs while on duty.  Investigation and disciplining of possible whistleblowers is still continuing.

Performance
 
In January 2018 the hospital was rated outstanding by the Care Quality Commission,  one of only seven general hospitals in England awarded the highest possible rating. The end-of-life service in particular was praised.

The Care Quality Commission conducted an inspection of West Suffolk Hospital between September and October 2019. The inspection's report was published on 30 January 2020, within which the hospital's rating had reduced by two grades to 'Requires improvement'. The components of the new grading comprised 'Good' for its 'effective and caring', and 'Requires improvement' for its 'responsive', 'well-led', and 'safe' categories. The CQC's specific areas of concern comprised the hospital's culture, organisational responsiveness, and maternity services.

References

External links
 

NHS hospitals in England
Hospital buildings completed in 1973
Hospitals in Suffolk
Bury St Edmunds